The Vines Convocation Center, also known as simply The Vines Center, is a 9,547-seat multi-purpose arena in Lynchburg, Virginia. It was built in 1990 and was home to the Liberty University Flames (men's) and Lady Flames (women's) basketball teams from its opening until the adjacent Liberty Arena opened in 2020. The Vines Center features three practice courts (1.5 each for men's and women's basketball), four spacious locker rooms, a weight room, a training room, men's and women's basketball team rooms, a team dining room, basketball coaches offices, a built-in TV studio, a center-hung scoreboard and a suite atop the seating bowl. It hosted the Big South Conference men's basketball tournament from 1995 to 1998, and also all rounds of the tourney except for the first round in 2003 and 2004.  In the fall of 2008 the Vines Center underwent a major renovation of all seating.  New red and blue cushioned seats were installed and new blue plastic game seats were put in place.

In addition to sporting events the Vines Center hosts Liberty's Convocations (mandatory meetings which are held on Wednesdays and Fridays of each week at 10:30 AM; attendance at Convocation is mandatory for all students, except for Convocation selects, which are held on Mondays at a different venue.) and commencement exercises.

The Vines Center was the largest basketball arena in the Big South Conference when Liberty was a member (1991–2018), and before the opening of Liberty Arena was the largest arena to serve as a regular basketball home in Liberty's current league, the ASUN Conference.

In 2020, the Vines Center was replaced as the main home to Flames and Lady Flames basketball and Lady Flames volleyball by the adjacent Liberty Arena. Liberty Arena hosts games and events where the attendance is not expected to exceed 4,000, while the Vines Center will continue to host high-attendance games and events.

See also
 List of NCAA Division I basketball arenas

Footnotes

References

External links
Liberty University
Facilities - Vines Center

College basketball venues in the United States
Basketball venues in Virginia
Buildings and structures in Lynchburg, Virginia
Liberty Flames and Lady Flames basketball
Tourist attractions in Lynchburg, Virginia
1990 establishments in Virginia